Cooperative Wheat Pool of Western Australia, commonly known as the Wheat Pool of Western Australia, is a cooperative of wheat growers in Western Australia. The cooperative was formed in 1922 and one of the inaugural trustees was Charles Walter Harper, who became the chairman of the Westralian Farmers Co-operative later the same year and then went on to form Cooperative Bulk Handling.

A conference had been held by wheat growers in Perth in March 1922, where it was decided to consider the formation of the pool rather than depend on speculative trading. In June 1922, the Chairman of the trustees, Mr A. J. Monger, announced that the state government would not introduce legislation to continue state pooling but that the new pool scheme would commence operating independently. The pool had sources adequate finance from the Commonwealth Bank to pay advances and had negotiated with pools in the eastern states to reduce competition. Participants in the scheme were sent a circular by the pool trustees: A. J. Monger (chairman), B. L. Murray, C. W. Harper and J. S. Teasdale. The circular outlined details of chartering ships, delaying construction of bulk handling facilities in Fremantle, construction of holding sheds in other areas, negotiations with the Mill Owners Association and quashing rumours that contracts were not binding.

For the 1923 harvest, the pool collected 9.75 million bushels of wheat.

Over the course of the 1924–1925 harvest, the pool received over 14 million bushels with a return to growers of a little over 6s per bushel, not including rail freight. Mr H. E. Braine was appointed as the secretary of the pool prior to 1925 and found himself defending the pool against complaints from farmers who claimed they had been given advice to store their grain and contributing to the pool later hoping the price would rise.

The quantity of wheat collected the next season was only just over 6 million bushels; the 1926–1927 season resulted in 17.93 million bushels being collected by the pool.

Following crop failures in India through 1928, the pool supplied over 14.25 million bushels to cover the short fall at prices as described by H. E. Braine as being "very satisfactory".

In 1932, the state government was approached by the Pool to confer upon the trustees sole acquiring rights of the land needed to set up bulk handling facilities. Initially the scheme was strongly opposed, and the bill introduced into the parliament was defeated as it was seen to grant a monopoly. In 1933, the bill was reintroduced after a two-season trial in the Wyalkatchem area. The Premier of Western Australia, Philip Collier, revealed that leases of land at 48 country railway sidings had been awarded to Cooperative Bulk Handling. The general manager of the Pool at this time was Mr. J. Thomson.

By 1935 the pool had estimated a harvest of over 27 million bushels after good rains had been recorded in July; the estimates were later downgraded to 20 million after a dry spell prior to harvesting.

The marketable harvest from the 1942–43 harvest collected by the pool was 18 million bushels. An early estimate of the following year's production was about 19 million bushels, of which 16.5 million was likely to be marketable.

References

Further reading
Wheat Pool Act 1932

Cooperatives in Australia
Grain industry of Western Australia
1922 establishments in Australia